Thomas Joseph Aquilino Jr. (born December 7, 1939) is a Senior United States Judge of the United States Court of International Trade.

Biography

Aquilino was born in 1939 in Mount Kisco, New York. He received a Bachelor of Arts degree in 1962 from Drew University. He received a Juris Doctor in 1969 from Rutgers Law School Newark campus. He served in the United States Army from 1962 to 1965. He served as a law clerk to Judge John Matthew Cannella of the United States District Court for the Southern District of New York from 1969 to 1971. He worked in private practice in New York City from 1971 to 1985. He was an adjunct professor of law at the Benjamin N. Cardozo School of Law from 1984 to 1995.

Trade court service

On February 25, 1985, President Reagan nominated Aquilino to be a Judge of the United States Court of International Trade, to the seat vacated by Judge Frederick Landis Jr. He was confirmed by the United States Senate on April 3, 1985 and received his commission the following day. He took senior status on December 10, 2004 and was succeeded by Judge Leo M. Gordon.

References

External links
 FJC Bio

1939 births
Drew University alumni
Judges of the United States Court of International Trade
Living people
People from Mount Kisco, New York
Rutgers University alumni
20th-century American judges
American people of Italian descent
United States federal judges appointed by Ronald Reagan